The Symphony No. 1 is the first symphony by the American composer John Harbison.  The work was commissioned by the Boston Symphony Orchestra and was composed in 1981.  It was given its world premiere in Boston on March 22, 1984 by the Boston Symphony Orchestra under the conductor Seiji Ozawa.

Composition
The symphony has a duration of roughly 24 minutes and is composed in four movements:
Drammatico
Allegro sfumato
Paesaggio: andante
Tempo giusto

Instrumentation
The work is scored for a large orchestra comprising three flutes (doubling piccolo and alto flute), three oboes (doubling English horn), three clarinets (doubling bass clarinet), three bassoons (doubling contrabassoon), four horns, two trumpets, three trombones, tuba, timpani, six percussionists, harp, and strings.

Reception
Reviewing a 1989 performance by the Philadelphia Orchestra, Lesley Valdes of The Philadelphia Inquirer wrote, "Although it sometimes overstresses its points, the symphony has heft and atmosphere."   She added:

References

1
1981 compositions
Harbison 1
Music commissioned by the Boston Symphony Orchestra